Matthevia is a genus of Cambrian molluscs, perhaps related to the chitons. It consists of repeated monoplacophoran-like shells; according to one hypothesis, chitons arose when these tall shells began to overlap over the generations.  The tall element of the shell was retained and forms the tips of modern chiton plates.  There are distinct head, 'centre', and tail valves, which occur approximately in the ratio 1:5:1 — suggesting a seven-plated configuration.

Matthevia was first described by Charles D. Walcott in 1885.

See also 
Mattheva

References

Prehistoric chiton genera
Cambrian molluscs
Cambrian animals of North America
Cambrian first appearances
Early Ordovician extinctions

Cambrian genus extinctions